Banyule may refer to places in Australia named after an Indigenous Australian word for "hill":

 Banyule, Victoria, a locality within Heidelberg, Victoria
 Banyule City Council, a local government area in Victoria
Banyule Homestead, historic property in Victoria

See also
 Banyuls-sur-Mer